Graziella is an 1852 novel by Alphonse de Lamartine.

Graziella may also refer to:
Graziella (given name), a feminine given name
Graziella (1926 film), a French film by Marcel Vandal
Graziella (1954 film), an Italian film by Giorgio Bianchi
Graziella (2015 film), a French film by Mehdi Charef

See also
Graciela (1915–2010), Cuban singer
Graciela (given name)
Graciella (disambiguation)